98th meridian may refer to:

98th meridian east, a line of longitude east of the Greenwich Meridian
98th meridian west, a line of longitude west of the Greenwich Meridian